The 1952 All-Ireland Minor Football Championship was the 21st staging of the All-Ireland Minor Football Championship, the Gaelic Athletic Association's premier inter-county Gaelic football tournament for boys under the age of 18.

Roscommon entered the championship as defending champions, however, they were defeated in the Connacht Championship.

On 29 September 1952, Galway won the championship following a 2-9 to 1-6 defeat of Cavan in the All-Ireland final. This was their first All-Ireland title.

Results

Connacht Minor Football Championship

Ulster Minor Football Championship

Leinster Minor Football Championship

Munster Minor Football Championship

All-Ireland Minor Football Championship
Semi-Finals

Final

Championship statistics

Miscellaneous

 In three of the provincial championships there are wins for teams after long absences. Cork and Westmeath win the respective Munster and Leinster titles for the first time since 1939, while Cavan claim the Ulster title for the first time since 1938.

References

1952
All-Ireland Minor Football Championship